The 1969 Fresno State Bulldogs football team represented Fresno State College—now known as California State University, Fresno—as a member of the Pacific Coast Athletic Association (PCAA) during the 1969 NCAA University Division football season. Led by fourth-year head coach Darryl Rogers, the Bulldogs compiled an overall record of 6–4 with a mark of 1–3 in conference play, tying for fifth place in the PCAA. This was Fresno State's first year competing at the NCAA University Division level and the inaugural season for the PCAA. The Bulldogs played their home games at Ratcliffe Stadium on the campus of Fresno City College in Fresno, California.

Schedule

Team players in the NFL
The following were selected in the 1970 NFL Draft.

References

Fresno State
Fresno State Bulldogs football seasons
Fresno State Bulldogs football